Secret Valley is a 1937 American Western film directed by Howard Bretherton. The film is also known as Gangster's Bride and Gangster's Valley in the United Kingdom.

Cast 
Richard Arlen as Lee Rogers
Virginia Grey as Jean Carlo
Jack Mulhall as Russell Parker
Norman Willis as Slick Collins aka Howard Carlo
Syd Saylor as Paddy
Russell Hicks as Austin Martin
Willie Fung as Tabasco
Maude Allen as Mrs. Hogan

External links 

1937 films
American black-and-white films
1937 Western (genre) films
American Western (genre) films
20th Century Fox films
Films produced by Sol Lesser
1930s English-language films
1930s American films